Jean Kockerols (born 13 August 1958 in Brecht, Belgium) is a Roman Catholic auxiliary bishop in Belgium.

Kockerols was ordained a priest on 18 September 1993 and was later the Dean of Brussels-South. He was appointed auxiliary bishop of the Archdiocese of Mechelen-Brussel and titular bishop of Ypres by Pope Benedict XVI on 22 February 2011 and consecrated on 3 April 2011.

References

21st-century Roman Catholic bishops in Belgium
1958 births
Living people
People from Brecht, Belgium
Belgian Roman Catholic titular bishops
Members of the Order of the Holy Sepulchre
Bishops appointed by Pope Benedict XVI